The Supreme Court of the Netherlands (  or simply Hoge Raad), officially the High Council of the Netherlands, is the final court of appeal in civil, criminal and tax cases in the Netherlands, including Curaçao, Sint Maarten and Aruba. The Court was established on 1 October 1838 and is located in The Hague.

The Supreme Court rules civil and criminal matters. In certain administrative cases it has final jurisdiction as well, while in other cases this jurisdiction rests with the adjudicative division of the Council of State (Raad van State), the Central Appeals Tribunal, the Trade and Industry Appeals Tribunal as well as judicial institutions in the Caribbean part of the Kingdom of the Netherlands. The Court is a court of cassation, which means that it has the competence to quash or affirm rulings of lower courts, but no competence to re-examine or question the facts. It only considers whether the lower courts applied the law correctly and the rulings have sufficient reasoning. In so doing it establishes case law. 

As the government of the Netherlands is characterised by parliamentary sovereignty, the Supreme Court cannot overturn primary legislation made by the States-General. This is laid out in Article 120 of the Constitution, which states that courts may not rule on the constitutionality of laws passed by the States General and treaties. With the exception of the Constitutional Court of Sint Maarten (which rules on constitutionality with regards to the Sint Maarten constitution only) courts thus have little competence for judicial review with respect to the Constitution. However, it is possible for courts (including the Supreme Court) to overturn secondary legislation made by the executive government.

The Supreme Court currently consists of 36 judges: a president, six vice presidents, twenty-five justices (literally "Lords of the Council") and four justices extraordinary. All judges are appointed for life, until they retire at their own request or mandatorily on their 70th birthday.

History 

The establishment of the Supreme Court on 1838 brought an end to the Great Council of Mechelen and its successor the Hoge Raad van Holland en Zeeland, which both served as high appellate courts.

Second World War 

During the German occupation, the Supreme Court kept functioning. In November 1940 the German occupiers forced its President, Lodewijk Ernst Visser, to resign because he was Jewish. Visser's colleagues did not protest. The members who remained also signed a compulsory declaration about Aryans.

After the liberation, people reproached the Court for a weak and legalistic attitude.  The Court wished above all to guarantee the continuity of its jurisdiction and not to become involved in politics.  However such chances as there were to take a stand on principle against the Germans were largely missed. The Justices either omitted to give a moral example or felt they were not in a position to do so.
This was demonstrated in a so-called "Test sentence", (Supreme Court, 12 January 1942, NJ 1942/271), in which the Supreme Court ruled that a Dutch judge could not contest the decrees of the occupying force on the basis of international law, in particular the 1907 regulation prescribed for a country at war. In this the Supreme Court followed the advice of the barrister-general A. Rombach.  The judgment concerned a case in which a man was sentenced by the economic judge for an "economic offence" (the purchase of pork without valid coupons).  The counsel for the accused, P. Groeneboom, argued in his defense before the Supreme Court on 27 October 1941 that the judge had the authority to challenge the regulations of the occupying force on the basis of the regulation prescribed for a country at war, the decree of the Führer and the first regulation of the government commissioner.  When the Supreme Court (in a judgment of 12 January 1942) denied the possibility of contesting rules issued by the German government, the Netherlands followed what was the rule in Germany and Italy too.  On the basis of two emergency measures Hitler had the authority to issue incontestable rules, and the legal establishment acknowledged not it was not allowed to challenge "political" measures. "Political" in this case was what the political authorities considered to be political.  In Italy the Court of Appeal recognized the free authority of Mussolini and the judge's lack of authority to control it.  Meihuizen says about the Dutch test sentence: "A sentence with far-reaching consequences because with this, barristers were not given the chance to bring before the judge the question of the validity of legislation which had been issued by or on behalf of the occupier."
The Supreme Court defended this sentence in retrospect with the conjecture that the Germans would never accept their decrees being contested and might have intervened in a negative way with the legal establishment, resulting in a further diminishing of citizens' legal protection.

In 1943, during the Second World War, the seat of the Supreme Court was temporarily moved from The Hague to Nijmegen.  With the liberation of Nijmegen in September 1944, this led to a situation in which, although the seat was on liberated ground, most of the Justices found themselves still in occupied territory.  After the war, there was not much done to clear matters; lawyers who had collaborated with the Germans generally kept their jobs or got important other positions. A crucial role in this affair was played by J. Donner, who became President of the Supreme Court in 1946.

Buildings
The court was located at a corner of the Binnenhof complex from 1838 until 1864, before moving to a building in the Plein, dubbed het hondenhok ("the doghouse"). The building was fully renovated in 1938 and finally demolished in 1988. At this point the Supreme Court moved to the Huguetan house at 34–36 Lange Voorhout, the previous home of the Koninklijke Bibliotheek (Royal Library of the Netherlands). In March 2016 the court moved into a new building at Korte Voorhout 8.

Authority 

In the Netherlands a case is first heard by one of the ten district courts. Afterwards, either side may appeal to one of the four courts of appeal. Finally, either party may file a cassation appeal to the Supreme Court.

Composition 

Justices of the Supreme Court are appointed by royal decree, chosen from a list of three, advised by the House of Representatives on the advice of the Court itself. The justices are, like every other judge in the Netherlands, appointed for life, until they retire at their own will or after reaching the age of 70. Upon reaching the age of 60, a justice may change status to extraordinary, with the effect that the justice no longer plays a full role at the Court.

The Supreme Court is divided into four chambers: the first or civil chamber, the second or criminal chamber, the third or tax chamber and the fourth or ombudsman chamber. The members of the fourth division are chosen , but will include the President of the Court.

Current justices 
, the first three chambers are composed as follows:

See also
 Judiciary of the Netherlands
 Law firms of the Netherlands
 List of presidents of the Supreme Court of the Netherlands

References

External links 

 

1838 establishments in the Netherlands
Courts in the Netherlands
Government of Aruba
Government of the Netherlands Antilles
Judiciary of the Netherlands
Netherlands
Courts and tribunals established in 1838